High Leys is located to the south-east of Rowrah in Cumbria (map), along the C2C cycle route prior to Sheriffs Gate.

The status of national nature reserve was awarded to High Leys due to its meadow status and the traditional hay-making and grazing methods employed during the land's working lifetime.

References

Geography of Cumbria
Nature reserves in Cumbria
National nature reserves in England